Ground of Humania 2012.3.20 in Makuhari is a live DVD concert by the Japanese rock band Nico Touches the Walls, recorded on March 20, 2012, and scheduled to be released on July 25.
The DVD was recorded at the last concert of the second leg of the 2012 tour to promote the album Humania.

Track listing
Heim
衝突
業々
友情讃歌
Hologram
泥んこドビー
Endless roll
波
恋をしよう
極東ID
トマト
カルーセル
The Bungy
Natsu no Daisankakkei
妄想隊員A
Broken Youth
Bicycle
Te o Tatake
Demon (is there?)

2012 video albums
Nico Touches the Walls albums